Aparajita Haque (born 14 June 1964) is a Bangladeshi politician who is elected as Member of 11th Jatiya Sangsad of Reserved Seats for Women. She is a politician of Bangladesh Awami League. Her father Khandaker Asaduzzaman was elected as an MP from Tangail-2.

References

Living people
1964 births
Awami League politicians
People from Tangail District
11th Jatiya Sangsad members
Women members of the Jatiya Sangsad
21st-century Bangladeshi women politicians